Russian-Armenian University (RAU) (РАУ) is an intergovernmental university being under the joint authority of the Russian Federation and Armenia. The languages of instruction and communication at the university are Russian and Armenian.

There are Russian and Armenian education sectors operating at RAU. Upon graduation, students receive two state Diplomas: Armenian and Russian.

History 

Russian-Armenian University was established following the inter-state agreement between Armenia and Russian Federation in 1997.

In 1999, Academician Levon Mkrtchyan, Doctor of Philology, became university's first Rector. The current rector is Armen Darbinyan.

The first students were enrolled in February 1999 in Law, Public and Municipal Administration and Journalism. Since then, the university has been constantly growing and encompassing new areas of education and research.

Starting from 2002, scientific centers, institutions and problem research groups have been developing within the university. In the same year RAU opened a post-graduate course.

In 2004 the reconstruction of the main building was finished, while in 2009 RAU opened its own Sports Complex.

On October 15, 2004, the Park of Gratitude was opened on the university premises as a symbol of the Russian-Armenian friendship. This very day has become the day of RAU.

On April 29, 2005 RAU was accredited by the Ministry of Education and Science of the Russian Federation.

Institutes and Departments 
 
Institute of Law and Politics 
 Department of Constitutional Law and Municipal Law
 Department of Political Science
 Department of International Law and European Law
 Department of Theory and History of Law and State
 Department of Criminal Law and Criminal Procedure Law
 Department of Civil Law and Civil Procedure Law
 Department of World Politics and International Relations
Institute of Mathematics and High Technology 
 Department of Mathematics and Mathematical Modeling
 Department of System Programming
 Department of Mathematical Cybernetics
 Department of Quantum and Optical Electronics
 Department of General Physics and Quantum Nano-Structures
 Department of Materials Technology and Structure of Electronic Technique
 Department of Telecommunications
 Department of Bioengineering, Bioinformatics and Molecular Biology
 Department of General and Pharmaceutical Chemistry
 Department of Medical Biochemistry and Biotechnology
 Department of Microelectronic Schemes and Systems (jointly with "Synopsis Armenia" company)
Institute of Economics and Business 
Department of Economic Theory and Challenges of Transition Economies
Department of Economics and Finance
Department of Management, Business and Tourism
 
Institute of Humanities
Department of Armenian Language and Literature
Department of Theory of Language and Cross-cultural Communication
Department of Psychology
Department of World History and Area Studies
Department of Philosophy
Department of Russian Language and Professional Communication
Department of World Literature and Culture
 
Institute of Media, Advertising and Film Production 
Department of Journalism
Department of Creative Industries

University-wide Departments 
 Department of Physical Education and Health

References

External links 
 Official Website

 
Educational institutions established in 1997
1997 establishments in Armenia